The Sanya Tram (Chinese: 三亚有轨电车) is a tram operating in Jiyang District, Sanya, Hainan, China.

History
Construction began in July 2016. Trial runs began on 1 January 2019 with services serving six stops. The first line fully opened on 10 October 2020.

Route
It takes about 35 minutes from one end to the other.

Technology

The tram operates without overhead wires. Instead, the trams are charged by contacts above each stop.

References

Tram transport in China